Byron Thames (born April 23, 1969) is an American television and film actor and musician.

Early life
Born in Jackson, Mississippi, his family moved shortly after his birth to New Orleans, Louisiana. He moved to Hollywood, California, with his mother at age eight to pursue a career as an actor.

Career 
After meeting actor/director Michael Landon, Thames was cast in the NBC television network dramatic television series Father Murphy in 1981 at the age of eleven opposite actor and former NFL athlete Merlin Olsen. The series ran for two seasons and ended in 1983. The following year, he was cast in Johnny Dangerously, playing the part of actor Michael Keaton's character as a child, and appeared in a starring role in the Mick Jagger-penned dramatic film Blame It on the Night.

In 1985 he received a starring role in Seven Minutes in Heaven. The film centered on the relationships of three teenage friends, portrayed by Thames, Jennifer Connelly and Maddie Corman. During the 1980s, Thames also made appearances in a number of television series, including: CHiPs, Silver Spoons, 21 Jump Street, Family Ties, Highway To Heaven and Brand New Life.

In 2001, he appeared in Don's Plum as the title character, "Don Plum". In 2004, he co-starred with James Vallo in the independent sci-fi comedy Space Daze which was distributed by Troma Entertainment in 2005 and then reprised his role in the 2009 sequel Spaced Out. In 2007, he teamed up again with Vallo and Space Daze writer/director John Wesley Norton playing the lead role in the then titled Working Title which was later released as Not Another B Movie in 2011 (also distributed by Troma).

Thames provided additional voices in two Blue Sky films Epic and Rio 2, along with Jim Conroy, John Storey, Randy Thom, Jason Harris Katz, Holly Dorff, David Cowgill, and more.

Personal life
Byron Thames married actress Lisa Alpert. They had one son together, singer and actor Hudson Thames. Later they divorced and he married actress Tricia Leigh Fisher in August 2007. The couple resides in Hollywood, California, with their child, as well as their children from his prior marriage and her previous relationship.

Filmography

Film

Television

References

External links
 
 

1969 births
American male film actors
American male television actors
American male child actors
Male actors from New Orleans
Musicians from New Orleans
Living people
20th-century American male actors
21st-century American male actors